Hamsat Shadalov (born 14 October 1998) is a German boxer. He competed in the men's featherweight event at the 2020 Summer Olympics.

References

External links
 

1998 births
Living people
German male boxers
Olympic boxers of Germany
Boxers at the 2020 Summer Olympics
Sportspeople from Grozny
European Games competitors for Germany
Boxers at the 2019 European Games